Shahzad Munshi is a Pakistani politician who was a Member of the Provincial Assembly of the Punjab, from May 2013 to May 2018.

Early life and education
He was born on 27 November 1969 in Lahore.

He graduated from Government Dayal Singh College, Lahore in 1989 from where received the degree of the Bachelor of Science.

Political career
He was elected to the Provincial Assembly of the Punjab as a candidate of Pakistan Muslim League (N) on reserved seat for minorities in 2013 Pakistani general election.

References

Living people
Punjab MPAs 2013–2018
Pakistan Muslim League (N) politicians
1969 births